Miguel Ángel Blanco Garrido (13 May 1968 – 13 July 1997) was a Spanish politician who was a councillor in Ermua in the Basque Country for the People's Party (PP). He was kidnapped and subsequently murdered by the separatist group ETA.

Biography

Early life
Miguel Ángel Blanco was born on 13 May 1968 in Ermua (Biscay) into a humble family. He had a sister, María del Mar. His father, Miguel Blanco, was a construction worker and his mother, Consuelo Garrido, was a housewife. They were Galician immigrants from Xunqueira de Espadanedo (Ourense, Galicia). Consuelo died on 1 April 2020 from coronavirus, three weeks after her husband's death.

Miguel Ángel Blanco graduated in economics at the Euskal Herriko Unibertsitatea in Sarriko. For a long time he worked with his father in construction, but he found work at Eman Consulting, in Eibar, where he commuted to every day by train. He also played the drums in the bands Póker and Cañaveral. He was a sports fan and his dream was to walk to Madrid to protest against the possible closure of the Ermua' sports centre.

He joined the youth-wing of the PP, Nuevas Generaciones, in 1995 and, due to it being a relatively small party in the area where the national parties compete against the PNV, he was the third candidate for the municipal elections in that year; he became a member of the town's council.

Kidnapping and murder
On 10 July 1997, Blanco was kidnapped by ETA on his way to see a client. They threatened to assassinate him unless the Spanish Government started transferring all ETA prisoners to prisons in the Basque Country within 48 hours. Hundreds of thousands of people gathered in demonstrations throughout Spain, demanding his release, but 50 minutes after the deadline expired, at 16:50 on 12 July, he was shot in the back of the head. Shortly thereafter, he was found on the outskirts of San Sebastián, with his hands tied, dying. He died in the hospital at 4:30 a.m. on 13 July. He is interred in Faramontaos, A Merca, with his parents.

Repercussions
His kidnapping and death were very important to Spanish society. It also had a deep impact upon Basque society, and, in an unprecedented move, even some of ETA's own supporters publicly condemned the killing. The "Spirit of Ermua" was born at this time as was the anti-terrorist organization Foro de Ermua and the Fundación Miguel Ángel Blanco.

2006 saw the beginning of the trial of his kidnappers and murderers, Francisco Javier García Gaztelu ("Txapote") and his girlfriend, Irantzu Gallastegi ("Amaia"). Another kidnapper, José Luis Geresta Mujika, committed suicide two years after Blanco's murder.

See also
List of kidnappings
List of solved missing person cases

References 

 General
 This article makes use of material translated from the corresponding article in the Spanish-language Wikipedia.
  Biography of Miguel Ángel Blanco in the Fundación Miguel Ángel Blanco webpage

1968 births
1997 deaths
1997 murders in Spain
People from Ermua
People's Party (Spain) politicians
Politicians from the Basque Country (autonomous community)
Assassinated Spanish politicians
People killed by ETA (separatist group)
Deaths by firearm in Spain
People murdered in Spain
University of the Basque Country alumni
Spanish terrorism victims
Kidnapped Spanish people